The 1892 United States presidential election in Wisconsin was held on November 8, 1892, as part of the 1892 United States presidential election. Wisconsin voters chose 12 electors to the Electoral College, who voted for president and vice president.

Democratic Party candidate Grover Cleveland won Wisconsin with 47.72 percent of the popular vote, winning the state's twelve electoral votes. As a result of his win, Cleveland became the first Democratic presidential candidate since Franklin Pierce in 1852 to win Wisconsin. No Democrat would win Wisconsin again until Woodrow Wilson in 1912. This marked the first occasion in which Wisconsin voted for a different candidate than Iowa, a phenomenon that has only occurred five more times since — 1924, 1940, 1976, 2004, and 2020. Along with California, and Illinois, Wisconsin is one of the three states that Cleveland lost in both 1884 and 1888 but won in 1892.

Results

Results by county

Notes

References

Wisconsin
1892 Wisconsin elections
1892